Waerenga is the name of a hamlet,  east of Te Kauwhata, which is part of a statistical area unit in the Waikato District.

Waerenga-a-Hika, near Gisborne has a similar name.

The area is in the Hukanui Waerenga ward of Waikato District Council.

Settlements in the area 
The area unit stretches between Lake Waikare and the summits of the Hapuakohe Range, at the boundary of Hauraki District. The area includes Taniwha, and the upper part of Whangamarino River.

Centres not covered in other articles are -

Taniwha 
It is in meshblock 0937700, which had 63 people in 2018. About 1900 the Taniwha estate was divided into smaller farms, with a creamery opened in 1902 and Taniwha School in 1905. The school closed in 1962, but the listed building remains.

Waerenga 
The hamlet has a garage, a few kilometres to the south on Taniwha Rd is a school and, further along, a 1928 war memorial church and 1962 hall. Meshblocks  0937800, 0936900, 0937200 and 0937300 meet at the hamlet, with total 2018 populations of 177.

Waerenga School started in 1881, was moved to a schoolhouse in 1882, moved   in 1928 and used as the school library from 1980. The years 1-6 school had 92 pupils in 2018 and 97 in 2015.

The original access was a bridle track from Rangiriri and a track to Lake Waikare, which was crossed by boat. The road from Te Kauwhata opened in 1880.

Other localities 

Other places in the area have had schools, or halls, but are even smaller. They include -

Its school, built in 1901, has closed. Matahuru and Waiterimu Hall was built in 1919 and refurbished recently.

Its school, built in 1918, closed in 1968.

Its school, built in 1903 on Waiu Road, was first known as Matahuru No. 2 School. A new open-air block was built in 1937. It closed in 2014, but became Huntly College Primary Industry Academy in 2016.

Demographics 

Waerenga had a population of 915 at the 2018 New Zealand census, an increase of 60 people (7.0%) since the 2013 census, and an increase of 36 people (4.1%) since the 2006 census. There were 324 households, comprising 468 males and 447 females, giving a sex ratio of 1.05 males per female. The median age was 42.0 years (compared with 37.4 years nationally), with 195 people (21.3%) aged under 15 years, 150 (16.4%) aged 15 to 29, 453 (49.5%) aged 30 to 64, and 117 (12.8%) aged 65 or older.

Ethnicities were 90.5% European/Pākehā, 15.1% Māori, 1.6% Pacific peoples, 2.6% Asian, and 1.0% other ethnicities. People may identify with more than one ethnicity.

The percentage of people born overseas was 12.1, compared with 27.1% nationally.

Although some people chose not to answer the census's question about religious affiliation, 52.5% had no religion, 37.7% were Christian, 0.3% had Māori religious beliefs, 0.7% were Buddhist and 2.0% had other religions.

Of those at least 15 years old, 102 (14.2%) people had a bachelor's or higher degree, and 156 (21.7%) people had no formal qualifications. The median income was $36,700, compared with $31,800 nationally. 135 people (18.8%) earned over $70,000 compared to 17.2% nationally. The employment status of those at least 15 was that 402 (55.8%) people were employed full-time, 129 (17.9%) were part-time, and 24 (3.3%) were unemployed.

History and culture 

Several pā sites exist and Ngāti Hine, Ngāti Naho and Ngāti Pou are associated with marae in the area. In 1863, at the Battle of Rangiriri, the area was lost and, after the invasion of the Waikato was completed, the land was confiscated. Parts were later returned, but most was sold to settlers, or granted to soldiers of the Third Waikato Regiment. The Great South Road came through the area in 1863 and the railway in 1877.

Marae

There are two marae in the area, affiliated with the Waikato Tainui hapū of Ngāti Tai, Ngāti Kuiaarangi, Ngāti Mahuta and Ngāti Whāwhākia: the Ōkarea Marae and Pokaiwhenua meeting house, and the Taniwha Marae and Me Whakatupu ki te Hua o te Rengarenga meeting house.

In October 2020, the Government committed $2,584,751 from the Provincial Growth Fund to upgrade Taniwha Marae and 7 other Waikato Tainui marae, creating 40 jobs.

Education

Notable people 

 Rob Storey, Federated Farmers president

References

External links 

 Waerenga School website

Waikato District
Populated places in Waikato